Annawan or Anawan may refer to:

Annawan (chief) (died 1676), a Wampanoag sachem
Anawan Rock, a colonial historic site in Rehoboth, Massachusetts
Annawan, Illinois, a town in Illinois
Annawan Township, in Henry County, Illinois